The Medicine Man is a 1930 American pre-Code comedy-drama film directed by Scott Pembroke, released by Tiffany Pictures, and starring Jack Benny, Betty Bronson and Eva Novak.

This was an early role for Jack Benny. After talking pictures took over the silent film, vaudeville died, and Benny and many other comedians went to motion pictures. The film was adapted from a play by Elliot Lester.

A print is preserved in the Library of Congress.

Synopsis
The son and daughter of a shopkeeper fall in with the leader of a traveling medicine show.

Cast
Jack Benny as Dr. John Harvey
Betty Bronson as Mamie Goltz
E. Alyn Warren as Goltz
Eva Novak as Hulda
Billy Butts as Buddy
Adolph Millar as Peter
George E. Stone as Steve
Tom Dugan as Charley
Vadim Uraneff as Gus
Caroline Rankin as Hattie
Dorothea Wolbert as Sister Wilson

References

External links 

The Medicine Man at BFI Database

1930 films
American romantic comedy films
1930 romantic comedy films
American black-and-white films
American films based on plays
Tiffany Pictures films
Films directed by Scott Pembroke
1930s English-language films
1930s American films